Emil Berger (born 23 May 1991) is a Swedish footballer who plays for Icelandic club Leiknir Reykjavík as a midfielder.

Club career
On 18 February 2021, Berger signed with Leiknir Reykjavík in Iceland.

References

External links

1991 births
Living people
Association football midfielders
Swedish footballers
Sweden under-21 international footballers
Degerfors IF players
AIK Fotboll players
AFC Eskilstuna players
Örebro SK players
Fylkir players
Kongsvinger IL Toppfotball players
BK Forward players
Rynninge IK players
Dalkurd FF players
Leiknir Reykjavík players
Allsvenskan players
Superettan players
Úrvalsdeild karla (football) players
Ettan Fotboll players
Swedish expatriate footballers
Expatriate footballers in Norway
Swedish expatriate sportspeople in Norway
Expatriate footballers in Iceland
Swedish expatriate sportspeople in Iceland